Gwendolyne Maxine Stacy is a fictional character appearing in American comic books published by Marvel Comics, usually as a supporting character in those featuring Spider-Man. A college student and the daughter of George Stacy and Helen Stacy, she was the first romantic interest for Peter Parker following his high school graduation before she was murdered by the Green Goblin (Norman Osborn). Her death has haunted Peter ever since, and stories  published long afterwards indicate she still holds a special place in his heart.

The character was portrayed by Bryce Dallas Howard in Spider-Man 3 (2007) and by Emma Stone in The Amazing Spider-Man film series (2012–2014). A multiverse Spider-Gwen is voiced by Hailee Steinfeld in the 2018 animated film Spider-Man: Into the Spider-Verse and will reprise the role in its sequel Spider-Man: Across the Spider-Verse (2023).

Publication history

Created by writer Stan Lee and artist Steve Ditko, Gwen Stacy first appeared in The Amazing Spider-Man #31 (December 1965). Stan Lee claimed that his wife, Joan, was the inspiration for Gwen.

Fictional character biography

Early history
In her initial appearances, Peter Parker met Gwen while both were studying as undergraduates at Empire State University, but with Aunt May in the hospital, Peter was troubled and ignored her advances. She dated both Flash Thompson and Harry Osborn to make Peter jealous. Gradually, however, a romance developed; Gwen, a science major, appreciated Peter's intellect. Their relationship began almost immediately after Peter stopped going out with Mary Jane Watson, whom he began to see as shallow and self-absorbed.

Later issues introduced Gwen's father, NYPD Captain George Stacy, as well as her mother Helen Stacy and her uncle Arthur Stacy. Though her father was both fond of Peter and supportive of his alter-ego Spider-Man, his death strained Peter's relationship with Gwen after he was killed by falling debris during a battle involving Spider-Man and Doctor Octopus. Gwen blamed Spider-Man for his death, and left for Europe to cope with her loss. She wanted Peter to ask her to marry him and convince her to stay, but his guilt stopped him from proposing. Gwen's feelings for Peter eventually prompted her to return to New York, and their relationship was rekindled.

According to Lee, who scripted all of the stories featuring Gwen Stacy up to this point, the original intent was for Gwen Stacy to be Spider-Man's central love interest. However, Mary Jane Watson's unexpected popularity with readers after her debut changed the course of the plan as fans liked Mary Jane more and demanded for her to be Peter Parker's main love interest instead, and that "no matter how we [i.e. Lee and his artist/co-plotter collaborators] wrote it, Mary Jane always seemed more interesting!"

Death

Gerry Conway and Roy Thomas succeeded Stan Lee as writer and editor, respectively, of The Amazing Spider-Man. Together with inker John Romita, Sr., they came to the decision to have Gwen Stacy killed off. It was Romita who first suggested the idea, during a plotting session with Conway when Romita was still penciller on The Amazing Spider-Man. Conway later said his contribution to the decision was motivated by a desire to bring Mary Jane Watson to the forefront, as he shared Lee's feeling that she was a more interesting character than Gwen Stacy: "[Mary Jane] hadn't lost the edge that made her an interesting character. Gwen didn't have an edge. She was just a nice person".

In The Amazing Spider-Man #121 (June 1973), the Green Goblin kidnaps Gwen Stacy and throws her off a bridge (depicted as the Brooklyn Bridge but described in the text as the George Washington Bridge). Spider-Man shoots a web strand at Gwen's legs and catches her, but her neck is broken by the whiplash from her sudden stop.

In Superior Spider-Man #3, Peter briefly reunites with Gwen and her father in the afterlife, along with all his other lost loved ones, while in Doctor Octopus's failing body. Peter apologizes to them both for failing them but neither hold Peter accountable with Gwen even saying that “it worked out” because they were “together” and kissed him on the cheek.

Both the decision to kill Gwen and the method in which Marvel implemented it remain controversial among fans because some believe that Peter himself was the one who caused her death. The death became a pivotal point in both Spider-Man's history and in American comic books in general. Many point to Gwen's death as the end of the Silver Age of Comics. Before her death, except possibly as part of an origin story, superheroes did not fail so catastrophically, nor did the hero's loved ones die so suddenly and without warning.

A note on the letters page of The Amazing Spider-Man #125 states: "It saddens us to say that the whiplash effect she underwent when Spidey's webbing stopped her so suddenly was, in fact, what killed her". The comic book Civil War: Casualties of War: Captain America/Iron Man (2007) concurred that the proximate cause of death was the sudden stop during a high-speed fall. An issue of Peter Parker/Spider-Man revisits the issue, and further confirms Gwen died of a broken neck due to the use of the webbing. On the other hand, in the 1987 edition of the Official Handbook of the Marvel Universe, Gwen's death is attributed to the fall, not to Spider-Man's webbing, though the listed cause of death is still technically true - if she hadn't fallen from the bridge, the event that caused her death couldn't have happened. In his book The Physics of Superheroes, physicist James Kakalios confirms that, consistent with Newton's laws of motion, the sudden stop would have killed Gwen Stacy.

Within the Marvel Comics, Gwen Stacy's death has enormous repercussions. Mary Jane Watson feels the loss of Gwen deeply and becomes a more mature, compassionate person. Gwen's death also draws Peter and Mary Jane into a closer friendship, and eventually to romance. Miles Warren, one of Gwen's professors, was secretly in love with her. Following her death, Warren goes insane and adopts the persona of the Jackal. In the fourth and final issue of the miniseries Marvels (April 1994), photographer Phil Sheldon befriends Gwen Stacy, who has absolved Spider-Man of any blame for her father's death. Gwen's simple faith in heroes convinces Sheldon of the purpose of the "Marvels" (i.e., superheroes)—to protect innocents such as Gwen. He resolves to write a book to praise the heroes and what they should mean to humanity. When the Green Goblin kidnaps Gwen and holds her hostage to bait Spider-Man, Sheldon frantically follows the resulting chase in a taxi and witnesses her death. While it is reported that she died from the shock of the fall, Sheldon thinks it looks like something else. Sheldon's faith in the Marvels is shattered.

Clones
Following the publication of The Amazing Spider-Man #121, Stan Lee (who had since become Marvel's publisher) was frequently criticized by fans during his public appearances for killing off Gwen Stacy. Lee, who had also found the character's death objectionable, insisted that Conway write a story bringing her back. Conway strongly objected since he felt any sort of resurrection would break the plausibility of the stories, but ultimately gave in under the condition that after reviving Gwen, he could write her out of the book as soon as he wanted. He decided that cloning would be the best means to bring the character back.

In the resulting story, written approximately two years after the story of Gwen Stacy's death, "Gwen" reappears, perfectly healthy but with no memory of the time since her death. This story, published in Amazing Spider-Man #144 (May 1975), initiated the original Clone Saga. At the end of that story, Gwen's clone, a creation of Spider-Man villain the Jackal, leaves to find a new life for herself, coming to accept that she is not really the same person who had a relationship with Peter Parker.

In the 1988 crossover "The Evolutionary War", the High Evolutionary, who had once been Miles Warren's teacher, captures Gwen's clone. He determines that Warren had actually not perfected the process, and instead injected a young woman with a genetic virus carrying Gwen's DNA, turning her into a copy of Gwen. After a subsequent altercation of Spider-Man and the Young Gods against the High Evolutionary's Purifiers, this woman is purged of the virus by the Young Goddess Daydreamer. This is later retconned, with the High Evolutionary stating that Warren had in fact succeeded in perfecting his own cloning technique, and Daydreamer had accidentally given the Gwen clone a false new life under the name of Joyce Delaney.

During the second "Clone Saga", Joyce, now married to a clone of Professor Warren named Warren Miles, sees a copy of Peter Parker's book of Spider-Man photos, Webs, and remembers (to an extent) her real history. She returns to New York City, but after helping Spider-Man and Scarlet Spider fight the Jackal, she again disappears from Spider-Man's life. She makes herself a new life in London, but before she is murdered by the Gwen Stacy clone known as Abby-L shows signs of clone degeneration.

Another Gwen clone appears in The Amazing Spider-Man #399 (March 1995). This clone believes she is the real Gwen. She dies from clone degeneration in Spider-Man #56 (March 1995), the next issue of the story arc.

A further Gwen clone appears in the "Sibling Rivalry" crossover storyline between Superior Spider-Man Team-Up and Scarlet Spider. She joins the Jackal (alongside Carrion and a regular Miles Warren clone) in capturing Superior Spider-Man and Kaine. She is sympathetic towards "Peter" and Kaine, but at the same time utterly loyal to the Jackal. When the Spiders break free, Superior Spider-Man disarms and attempts to kill her, but is stopped by Kaine. When the Jackal's lab is engulfed in flames, Kaine offers to save her, but she refuses, and is seemingly consumed by the fire.

"Stacy Twins": Sarah and Gabriel
The story arc "Sins Past" by J. Michael Straczynski reveals that Gwen Stacy had an affair with Norman Osborn and fell pregnant with twins, a girl and a boy, to whom she gave birth while in France, and named Sarah and Gabriel Stacy, respectively. Gwen vowed to raise the twins with Peter Parker and refused to allow Norman access—an event which precipitated Norman's decision to kill her. By the time that Peter and his (then-considered-to-be) wife, Mary Jane Watson-Parker, discovered the twins' existence, they were grown to adult proportions, despite the relatively "short" time since Gwen's death, due to the genetic effects of their father's "goblin formula".

Sarah and Gabriel revealed their existence to Peter, with threats and as masked figures, after their father was publicly exposed as the Green Goblin—sending to Peter a page of an unsent letter from Gwen "from a time when she traveled to Europe between college semesters"—which revealed her pregnancy; an analysis of the letter by police detective Lamont revealed handwriting impressions of a second page—saying that she had given birth, with the twins born fully developed after only seven month's gestation. When Peter as Spider-Man went a genetics lab, where he would prove Gwen's maternity of the twins, Sarah confronted him, and Spider-Man unmasked Sarah—finding her to be "a dead ringer for Gwen". Gwen Stacy herself, however, only appears in this story arc in flashback, as Mary Jane explained to Peter that she knew about Gwen's illegitimate offspring and Norman's paternity thereof because she overheard Gwen and Norman arguing over custody of the children—a secret of Gwen's that Mary Jane had "promised to keep all these years". Sarah later signed up with Interpol, while Gabriel later become the Gray Goblin.

Marvel would later walk back on this revelation in the pages of Nick Spencer's run on Amazing Spider-Man during the Sinister War event. Norman Osborn arrives at the safe house of Gabriel and Sarah in Paris, where an Artificial Intelligence back-up copy of his son Harry reveals to Norman that he never truly fathered the twins, and that he never had a sexual encounter with Gwen Stacy. The whole plan was to convince him he had the heirs he always wanted, so AI Harry hypnotized Norman and Mary Jane Watson with the help of Mysterio and the Chameleon, while Mendel Stromm created the mutated twins in a lab (this explains their rapid aging, as it's not truly related to Osborn's Goblin serum). Thus, this is all an elaborate scheme of Harry's to torment both his father and Peter.

(See article Sarah and Gabriel Stacy for more information.)

Dead No More: The Clone Conspiracy
In the Clone Conspiracy storyline, a flashback revealed that Gwen Stacy was conscious during Spider-Man and Green Goblin's battle on the bridge, and as she was falling to her death. She overheard their conversation and discovered Peter is Spider-Man in the process. She was angry at Peter for keeping this secret and for his involvement in her father's death. This flashback confirms the Green Goblin's real motivations for the murder: he clearly states that Gwen "is just a pawn", contradicting the whole core of Sins Past in which Osborn wanted to kill her to keep the twins with him and silence her forever. The whole "Stacy-Osborn" affair was retconned during the Sinister War event, 17 years later.

In the present, Gwen is supposedly revived by the Jackal—who here would later be revealed to be a re-animated Ben Reilly (Spider-Man's main clone)—with his clones. The Jackal tells her she is not a clone but the real Gwen, who was harvested and reanimated from her remains and still has all her memories, including those of her death. The Jackal offers Gwen the opportunity to be his business partner as he tries to change the world with his new technology. Gwen is hesitant about this new life at first but accepts it when the Jackal shows that he has reanimated the clone of her father, who is in much better health than he was before he died. When Spider-Man arrives at the incorporation and discovers the Jackal's experiments, he is surprised by Gwen's presence and notes that unlike the other people the Jackal revived, who were all clones, Gwen does not trigger his spider sense, making him wonder if she was the real one. He is attacked by the "reborn" Doctor Octopus before he can question the issue further.

After the Jackal breaks up the fight and shows Spider-Man around the New U, the George Stacy clone recognizes something off about Gwen's face and points his gun at her. It is revealed that the Gwen clone was actually her Earth-65 counterpart Spider-Woman who assists Spider-Man in escaping. The real Gwen is kidnapped by Kaine and taken to Parker Industries to be studied. Kaine reveals that he and Spider-Woman came to this Earth to assist Spider-Man because they saw that Spider-Man agreeing with the Jackal's offer on other worlds always results in a global disaster. Rhino and (a version of) Electro are sent to retrieve Gwen after attacking the staff, but Gwen tells them to take Kaine with him too because his condition could help with Jackal's experiments. Anna Maria Marconi also volunteers to come with because she has studied both Kaine and the drug.

When Spider-Man is taken to Haven, he catches up with Gwen in the household in the facility, where she tries to convince him to support New U Technologies. Peter still has a hard time believing she is the real Gwen given his other experiences with clones. Gwen tries justifying her existence by telling Peter her memories, including how she overheard the Green Goblin talking to Spider-Man before her death. Peter thinks she died hating him, but Gwen said that she did not hate him, but rather died feeling betrayed. Peter again still has doubts towards Gwen not being a clone. She tries kissing him, to no avail which only pushes him to put the mask back on. Gwen witnesses Jackal order the cloned villains to kill Spider-Man and decides to help Peter.

Doctor Octopus pulls a switch that activates the Carrion Virus in all of the revived, including Gwen and George, and causes them to start rapidly decaying. After Gwen's father deteriorates in her arms, she assists Spider-Man by helping him get to the lab. When the cloned villains get to the lab doors, Gwen locks Spider-Man inside the lab and sacrifices herself to give him more time. Following the Carrion Virus being thwarted, Spider-Man and Anna check the building and see that Gwen has been reduced to dust.

During the "Last Remains" storyline, Kindred later visited the cemetery where Gwen Stacy and George Stacy were buried. He exhumed their bodies and placed them around the table at his hideout while awaiting for Spider-Man to find him. When Spider-Man finally confronts Kindred, Gwen and George's corpses were sat around a dinner table alongside the exhumed bodies of Ben Parker, Flash Thompson, J. Jonah Jameson Sr., Jean DeWolff, and Marla Jameson.

A.X.E. Judgment Day
In the Judgment Day crossover event, the Celestial known as the Progenitor is resurrected and gives humanity 24 hours to justify their existence and judges each human individually. The Progenitor appears to Peter in the form of Gwen, who watches him as he spends the day helping his friends and loved ones. When he shows visible discomfort over Peter working for Norman Osborn, Peter tells him he has a responsibility to help Norman and keep him from becoming the Green Goblin again. The Progenitor deems Peter as worthy and rewards him by briefly resurrecting the real Gwen to give them one last moment together. Norman witnesses their reunion but brushes it aside as it is revealed the Progenitor also appeared to him as Gwen.

Other versions

"Age of Apocalypse"
In the two-issue mini-series X-Universe, which details what happened to the rest of the Marvel Universe during the "Age of Apocalypse" storyline, the Green Goblin never killed Gwen Stacy. Instead she became the bodyguard of Donald Blake, who, in this reality, had never become the Mighty Thor. Sometime later in the mainstream universe in X-Man #37, the Age of Apocalypse version of Gwen is pulled from her reality to the mainstream Earth's George Washington Bridge, much to Spider-Man's shock.

"Heroes Reborn"
In the Heroes Reborn event, a change in the timeline results in a continuity in which the Squadron Supreme are Earth's mightiest heroes while the Avengers never came to be. In this reality, Gwen was inspired by her mother to become a psychiatrist at Ravencroft Asylum. After the death of the Falcon (which mirrors how Gwen died in the main continuity), she was trained by Nighthawk and became the vigilante known as Nightbird. She briefly dated Flash Thompson for a time, but her refusal to be with him drove him to be insane and become the second Jackal. She also appears to have a close relationship with Misty Knight.

"House of M"
In the reality seen in the "House of M" storyline, in which the Scarlet Witch alters reality to make mutants the ruling class over humans, Gwen was never killed. Instead, she married Peter Parker, and the couple had a young son. She had become a scientist, a savvy businesswoman, and a peace activist – and had a decidedly hostile relationship with chemical weapon developer Norman Osborn. Mary Jane Watson, a popular actress in this reality, played Gwen Stacy in the film adaptation of Spider-Man's life story. Gwen and her father read textual accounts of their deaths in the main universe, though they believe this simply to be the morbid imaginings of Peter Parker, who is suffering from mental health issues.

Marvel Adventures
Gwen Stacy first appeared in Marvel Adventures Spider-Man #53 as a new student of Midtown High. She had transferred from her previous school after the Torino Gang, a powerful New York mob, began harassing her in an attempt to keep her father, police captain George Stacy, from arresting members of their gang. However, the Torinos continued to harass Gwen at Midtown, prompting Spider-Man to help the police take down the gang. Like her father, Gwen believes Spider-Man is a hero. She subsequently began participating in a "Spider-Man Appreciation Society" designed to foster better public opinion of Spider-Man. Gwen is also attracted to Spider-Man's alter ego Peter Parker; although she openly flirted with him, Peter began dating a different girl, Sophia "Chat" Sanduval, which made Gwen very unhappy. Later, Gwen was brainwashed by Emma Frost into believing she was dating Peter. Gwen's brainwashing wore off (or was undone by Emma), but Gwen now believes her relationship with Peter ended when he chose Chat over her, causing her to treat Chat very coldly. She has since warmed to Chat, however. Recently, Gwen began a close friendship with Carter Torino who is the grandson of the head of the Torino Gang. Their relationship is complicated by the fact Gwen's father is still trying to take down Carter's criminal family.

Marvel Zombies Return
In the limited series, Marvel Zombies Return, Gwen of 'Earth Z' is still a college student out with her friends Mary Jane and Harry Osborn. The zombified Spider-Man travels to this earth and, despite his best intentions, turns the Sinister Six. They then slay and partly consume Gwen and her friends. To stop the spread of the virus, Spider-Man obliterates the bodies.

Powerless
In the Powerless mini-series, Gwen Stacy again appears as the girlfriend of Peter Parker. Norman Osborn again kidnaps and attempts to kill her as a part of a plan to intimidate Peter. In a twist, the powerless Peter (with a limb crippled from a spider bite) manages to save Gwen from falling to her death.

Spider-Gwen

In the alternate reality designated Earth-65, Gwen Stacy is the one bitten by the radioactive spider, and becomes a superhero going by the name of Spider-Woman. She is also a member of a band fronted by Mary Jane Watson, simply called the Mary Janes. Shortly after Gwen begins fighting crime, Peter Parker, her best friend attempts to exact revenge on those who bullied him, becoming this universe's version of the Lizard. Gwen subdues him, but Peter dies towards the end of the battle due to the chemical he used. Spider-Woman is blamed for his death, causing an outcry for her arrest, led by J. Jonah Jameson. Her father, who is also a police chief in this world, begins a hunt for her. This follows Gwen into college, where she is still a member of the Mary Janes. At a gig of theirs, an assassin is sent after Gwen's father, who is in the audience. Gwen defeats the assassin, the audience and band clearing out during the battle. While they are alone, Captain Stacy holds Spider-Woman at gun point, with Gwen taking off her mask to reveal who she is. Shocked upon learning Spider-Woman's identity, he tells her to run before he changes his mind. In the distance, the Captain Britain from Earth-833, called Spider-UK, is watching, saying that Gwen will "do quite nicely".

Gwen is recruited by Spider-UK to team up with other Spider-Totems across the multiverse, and next appears on Earth-616 with Old Man Spider-Man of Earth-4 and Spider-Man of Earth-70105 (who in that reality is Bruce Banner) to rescue Kaine, who was under attack by the Inheritors. Marvel-616 Peter is hesitant to put Gwen in action and she is told by the others of how he failed to save her in his world. However he does recruit her for a mission and they both agree to look out for each other. Gwen is sent to recruit an alternate version of Peter Parker who is driven insane after he failed to save the Gwen Stacy in his dimension, killed the Green Goblin, and became the Hobgoblin. She tells him that he can become the man he once was if he joins them, but they are attacked by the Inheritors. Hobgoblin sacrifices himself to save Gwen.

After the events of Spider-Verse, Gwen returns to her home of Earth-65 where she continues her career as Spider-Woman in her own solo series, Spider-Gwen. She first saves George Stacy from mercenary Aleksei Sytsevich who was sent by Wilson Fisk and his lawyer Matt Murdock to target him; Murdock is ultimately revealed to be the real Kingpin, with Fisk serving as his patsy. Then she begins a hunt for the Vulture who has been terrorizing the city in her absence.

She appears as one of the main characters in the Secret Wars Spider-Verse event with Spider-Ham, Spider-Girl, Spider-UK, Spider-Man Noir, and Spider-Man India in a Battleworld called Archania ruled by Norman Osborn. They eventually form a team called the Web Warriors where they help other Spider-Men and Women in various dimensions. A child version of her also appears in Giant Size Little Marvel Avengers vs X-Men as a new kid that Tony Stark tries to ask out on a date. She rejects him because he's a kid with a goatee and mustache. Another version of her is a member of Arcadia's's A-Force. On Earth-8, she is married to Miles Morales and they have two children with Spider Powers.

Spider-Punk
In an issue of Web Warriors, Spider-Punk mentions that the Gwen Stacy in his dimension was a musical icon.

Spider-Man: Fairy Tales
Issue #1 of Spider-Man: Fairy Tales follows the fairy tale of Little Red Riding Hood, reimagined with Mary Jane Watson as the titular character. Gwen Stacy has been previously killed by the wolf. Issue #4 is an adaption of Cinderella with Gwen as Princess Gwendolyn. She falls in love with the masked "Prince of Arachne" who is revealed to be Peter Parker, servant to Sir Osborn, but is killed during a fight between Osborn and Parker.

Spider-Man Loves Mary Jane
Gwen Stacy first appears at the end of Spider-Man Loves Mary Jane #5. She is the new girl at school and quickly becomes close friends with Peter Parker. In Spider-Man Loves Mary Jane #9, Peter and Gwen take their relationship to the next level by sharing a tender kiss, much to the dismay of Mary Jane. They date for a time, though Gwen breaks up with Peter when she learns Mary Jane is the girl he claims he truly loves. MJ, attempting to fix this, breaks up with Peter and reunites with Harry, though eventually she and Peter realize that neither of them are as happy with Gwen and Harry as they were with each other, and break up with them to start dating each other again.

Spider-Man: Life Story
Spider-Man: Life Story features an alternate continuity where the characters naturally age after Peter Parker becomes Spider-Man in 1962. In 1966, Gwen discovers that Peter is Spider-Man when she sees his costume underneath Peter's shirt at the train station shortly after Flash was deployed to Vietnam. She eventually marries Peter and becomes Chief Biologist for Miles Warren's bio-engineering company. In 1977, Harry Osborn's attack on Warren's company as the Black Goblin revealed that Miles created clones of Norman Osborn, Peter, and Gwen. Harry blows up the containment tubes containing the clones which kills all of them except for Peter's clone. However, Miles reveals that the "Gwen" Peter was with was actually her clone; he abducted the real Gwen with the intention of attempting to win her over later, with the result that the real Gwen died in the explosion. A year later, Peter and Gwen's clones rename themselves as Ben and Helen Parker and move out of New York for a second chance at life, the clone's relationship with the original Peter apparently not surviving the revelation of her clone status.

She and Ben eventually split up and she renamed herself Helen Carroll. After years of therapy, she was inspired to become a prison therapist to help those whose lives were ruined by super heroes and worked closely with Norman Osborn and J. Jonah Jameson.

Spider-Man Unlimited
In the fourth issue of the comic book based on the Spider-Man Unlimited animated series, Spidey encounters a Counter-Earth version of Gwen Stacy. She helps him escape a hidden paradise known as "The Haven".

Ultimate Marvel
Gwen Stacy first appears in the Ultimate Marvel universe in Ultimate Spider-Man #14 (December 2001) as a teenage girl at Peter's high school. In this continuity, Gwen, whose rendition by artist Mark Bagley was inspired by an early-career Madonna, has amber eyes, wears punk-style clothing, and harbors a rebellious personality. In her first appearance, she gives a rousing speech on 'super powers' and later pulls a knife on Kong, one of Peter's bullies, and is suspended from school temporarily. Gwen becomes friends with Peter, which leads Mary Jane Watson to believe she is vying for his affections.

Gwen is later taken in by Aunt May after her father, police captain John Stacy, is killed by a burglar wearing a Spider-Man costume and her estranged mother does not want to take her in. Her living in the Parker house creates more tension between Peter and Mary Jane, and leads to their temporary break-up. Peter's relationship with Gwen is further complicated by her hatred of Spider-Man, whom she blames for her father's death. When Peter finds his friend Eddie Brock, Gwen confides in him about her feelings of isolation. Eddie then tries to kiss her and Gwen is shocked. When she eventually learns Peter is Spider-Man, the angry Gwen pulls her father's gun on him. He manages to convince her he is not to blame for her father's death. Gwen runs off but returns, explaining she is just really mad at everything at the moment. She wouldn't have really shot him, a fact Peter already knew because his spider sense didn't go off despite Gwen's wrath. Gwen then agrees to keep his secret.

Gwen Stacy dies in Ultimate Spider-Man #62. Before her death, she made peace with Mary Jane and assured her she never had romantic feelings for Peter. She considered him just as a friend. She is killed by Carnage, a symbiotic which is the offspring of the Venom symbiote. Although Peter is not in the area when she dies, he still feels some responsibility for her death, as he allowed Dr. Connors to use his genetic material for experimentation. His guilt makes him decide to retire as Spider-Man for a while. Eventually, he takes up his hero identity when his responsibility for the innocent becomes too great to overlook. At the end of the arc, there was an issue that dealt with Gwen's death. Flash Thompson makes an off-color remark about Gwen's passing. It infuriates MJ to the point where she physically attacks Flash. It is revealed Flash had a crush on Gwen all along.

A girl seeming to be Gwen Stacy appears in Ultimate Spider-Man #98. According to Mark Bagley, "Gwen’s return is integral to the Clone storyline and is basically a way to rock Peter's world...again". In this issue "Gwen" appears to have no memory of her "death" and believes she was in a hospital, from which she has escaped. In issue #100, after a raft of revelations, the stress of the situation enrages "Gwen". She transforms into what appears to be Carnage before leaping out the window. In the next issue, "Richard Parker" claims "Gwen" should not have met Peter at all, and was merely an experiment in stem cell research. This Gwen/Carnage fights with the Fantastic Four, Nick Fury, and the Spider-Slayer drones, until she is knocked unconscious by a beam of light, and taken into custody. In issue #113, Norman Osborn as the Green Goblin causes a massive prison break from the Triskelion. An inmate appearing to be 'Gwen' walks out amidst the chaos, disappearing in the shadows. It has been revealed the creature posing as Gwen Stacy is still the original Ultimate Carnage Spider-Man faced earlier in its run. After "devouring" Gwen, this incarnation of Carnage has gone on to mimic her "essence" and now believes itself to be Gwen Stacy.

During the "War of the Symbiotes" storyline, Gwen/Carnage's back story in the Triskelion is revealed. It is shown Gwen has been taking some form of therapy with Tony Stark. However, when the Green Goblin broke out of the Triskelion, Gwen escaped and went to Peter Parker's house in a confused and terrified state, with Carnage's face on her body. During an exchange between Peter and Gwen, Eddie Brock attempts to attack Aunt May and retake his symbiote. In a rage, Spider-Man engages Venom on a nearby rooftop. During the fight, Gwen is shown to be able to use her symbiote to fight off Eddie but Eddie reabsorbs his symbiote along with the Carnage symbiote rendering Gwen Stacy an average girl. After a series of tests, it is concluded that this Gwen is not a clone but consciously and genetically is the original now reborn (though Gwen's original body died, the Carnage symbiote absorbed her being and they had bonded since her death). After S.H.I.E.L.D. intervenes, S.H.I.E.L.D. Director Danvers states Gwen will remain in S.H.I.E.L.D. custody. Peter and May argue for her to come back to live with them, with Tony Stark supporting the Parkers. In Ultimate Spider-Man #129, the Parkers are now helping to rebuild Gwen's life. Her ghastly experience with the Carnage symbiote also causes her to develop a death anxiety she gradually controls. Six months after the "Ultimatum" storyline, in Ultimate Comics Spider-Man #1, Gwen is living with the Parkers again and is dating Peter after MJ broke up with him. However, circumstances involving the Chameleon made Gwen realize that Peter and MJ are still in love, and believes that they shouldn't be together, even if she wants to be with him. She breaks up with him, but vows to be his loyal friend. She also continues to live with the Parkers due to Gwen and Aunt May having become close in a surrogate mother-daughter fashion.

After Peter's death, Gwen and May re-locate to France but return to New York after hearing about the re-emergence of a new Spider-Man, Miles Morales.

During the "Spider-Men" storyline, Gwen and Aunt May meet the Peter Parker of the Earth-616 continuity after he is accidentally and briefly sent to the Ultimate universe. They even attack him, as they believe he is trying to imposter their Peter. It is only through his mannerisms similar to Peter and his choice of words that they believe that he is not an imposter. Gwen, being intrigued to learn about her counterpart (although she is not informed that her other self dead), talks with him. Later, she also tries to tell Mary Jane about the other Peter's arrival in their world, as the two have formed a friendship.

When Green Goblin escapes custody after S.H.I.E.L.D. was shut down, he arrives at the front yard of Aunt May's house and confronts Miles. Gwen and Aunt May are inside watching the television where the battle of Miles and Green Goblin was being broadcast. Soon, Peter emerges to aid Miles in the fight, to the surprise of Gwen and Aunt May. Green Goblin flees at his arrival and the two Spider-Men depart. Gwen is unsure of the identity of the original Spider-Man, but Aunt May assures her that his motives show that it is him. Later, Gwen and Aunt May walk over to Mary Jane's house and overhear Peter's explanation of his unknown resurrection. Gwen sprints over and joyfully reunites with him. After the two Spider-Men defeat Green Goblin, Peter tells Gwen that he intends to go on a quest to find out the truth of his mystery resurrection and leaves her and Aunt May once more, promising to return.

The Ultimate Universe is destroyed in the Secret Wars event, but the world is restored later on. In it, Peter returns to the role of Spider-Man and Gwen is possibly still living with Aunt May.

Early in the series, Ultimate Spider-Man #25 (October 2002) paid homage to Gwen Stacy's death in the Earth-616 continuity, although Gwen herself was not involved. The Green Goblin tossed Mary Jane off the Queensboro Bridge. Spider-Man caught her leg with his webbing, just as with Gwen. The issue ended with a cliffhanger: when Spider-Man pulled Mary Jane up, she appeared to be either unconscious or dead. The cliffhanger was resolved in the next issue when Mary Jane awoke in #26, uninjured.

What If
In "What if Gwen Stacy had lived?", Peter saves Gwen by jumping after her rather than catching her with a web-line. In doing this, he cushions her from the impact as they hit the water and subsequently gives her CPR. After regaining consciousness, Gwen sees him without his mask. After explaining himself to her, Peter proposes to Gwen, and she accepts. Meanwhile, the Green Goblin mails to J. Jonah Jameson proof of Spider-Man's real identity. On the day of Peter's wedding to Gwen, Jonah has published the expose and uses it to acquire a warrant for Peter's arrest. Peter escapes from the police moments after his wedding to Gwen, but the issue ends with Peter on the run from the law and pondering his uncertain future. As the issue ends, Gwen departs with Joe 'Robbie' Robertson, who promises Gwen they will do whatever they can to help Peter and quits the Bugle.
In "What If Spider-Man Had Kept His Six Arms?", Spider-Man (whose six-arms mutation was permanent here) is able to prevent Gwen Stacy's death.
At the very end of Peter David's one-shot "What If: The Other", Peter Parker (now calling himself "Poison") uses part of the Venom symbiote attached to him in the resurrection of Gwen Stacy. She takes the appearance of Carnage.
In "What if Peter Parker became the Punisher?", Peter (who is the Punisher in this continuity) is able to save Gwen by killing the Green Goblin and webbing her body to a suspended scaffold on the bridge. Feeling guilty over almost getting her killed, he quits being the Punisher to be with her.

Earth-617
The Gwen Stacy of this reality had a similar history to the main iteration of the character, until she encountered a Gwen Stacy from a future alternate timeline. At first, thinking that this Gwen was a clone, she later learned that this Gwen was actually a superhero, but when trying to get more information, Spider-Gwen fled in a rage. She learned that Spider-Gwen's father had been put in a coma, which caused her rage, then Gwen helped her counterpart to come to epiphany that she should treasure that she still has her father alive in contrast to her, whose father had died. After that, Gwen with the help of Tony Stark and Hank Pym of this reality, successfully send Spider-Gwen to her timeline. After this encounter, Gwen was inspired to become a detective and bonded to the Venom symbiote of her reality to become Spider-Woman. With the use of a Dimensional Travel Watch, she was able to travel across the multiverse and encountered other versions of herself; some of which who had also become Spider-Woman. With these Spider-Women, they formed the Council of Spider-Women and they avoided the Spider-Verse event. She then came across the Spider-Gwen from the past and sent her to her past timeline, creating a time-loop. She then terrorized the Uatus from Earth-65 and Earth-8, since they were fighting the children of Miles Morales and Gwen Stacy. After that, she returned to her reality to fight crime.

Secret Wars
In Secret Wars: Battleworld #3, a version of Gwen with the powers of Wolverine called Gwenverine, was brought along with the other Wolverines by Mojo, into fighting the pacifist Monk Wolverine.

Spider-Geddon
During the return of the Inheritors, Spider-Gwen's device to travel through the multiverse got destroyed by Verna and then Gwen got stranded in an alternate universe. In this universe, Peter Parker and this universe's Gwen Stacy got jobs at Oscorp and Peter wanted to create a cure for cancer, after his Uncle Ben died from it. Peter was experimenting with spider venom to create the cure, but one of the spiders bit Harry Osborn, making Harry this universe's Spider-Man. Harry, alongside Gwen Stacy as this universe's Green Goblin, started to fight crime together, where they even took down Vulture. This lasted until a fight with the Sandman where both Harry and George Stacy were killed. The accident did something to the circuitry that enabled Gwen to control the Goblin Glider that left her mostly acting like the Green Goblin, with no memory of being Gwen Stacy. Spider-Gwen is eventually able to free her counterpart from her insanity. To thank her, the Goblin Gwen fixes Spider-Gwen's multiversal travel device to allow her to return to her allies.

In other media

Television

 Gwen Stacy was deliberately excluded from the 1990s Spider-Man animated series as the creators felt they could neither allow her to live nor include a character who was going to die, leading to Felicia Hardy filling her role as Peter's first love interest prior to Mary Jane's introduction. Despite this, an alternate universe version of Stacy appeared in the two-part series finale "Spider Wars", voiced by Mary Kay Bergman. This version is the fiancée of an alternate universe version of Spider-Man who became a rich industrialist. 
 Gwen Stacy appears as a main character in The Spectacular Spider-Man, voiced by Lacey Chabert. This version is a teenager and friend of Peter Parker and Harry Osborn who has hidden romantic feelings for the former, expressing hurt whenever he expresses interest in other girls. Throughout season one, she becomes concerned when Harry becomes addicted to the drug Gobulin Green and kisses Parker, leaving them in an awkward standing in season two. Despite their feelings for each other, Parker begins dating Liz Allan while Stacy dates Harry. In the series finale, she and Parker acknowledge how they feel about each other and agree to break up with Harry and Allan. Following Norman Osborn's apparent death however, Stacy stays with Harry to care for him.

Film

Sam Raimi series
 A student in Peter Parker's university class from Spider-Man 2, portrayed by an uncredited extra, is identified as Gwen Stacy in the film's novelization.
 Gwen Stacy appears in Spider-Man 3,  portrayed by Bryce Dallas Howard. This version is a model, classmate, and lab partner of Parker's, and Eddie Brock's ex-girlfriend. After Spider-Man rescues Stacy, he urges her to kiss him during a public ceremony, upsetting his girlfriend, Mary Jane Watson. While on a date with Brock, Stacy leaves him for a symbiote-influenced Parker, only to realize he was trying to make Watson jealous. Upset, Stacy apologizes to Watson and leaves Parker.
 Howard has stated she would love to be a part of any continuation of the film franchise, while acknowledging her character's opportunity may have passed, especially after Spider-Man 3 ended with Parker and Watson once again in each other's arms. In May 2007, actor James Cromwell, who played, Captain Stacy in the film, stated he thought the natural progression for the character would be for both to die early in Spider-Man 4, mirroring the comics, with Howard adding that it would not have bothered her. Due to a reboot however, the film was cancelled, although Stacy was left in the draft.

Marc Webb series

 Emma Stone portrays Gwen Stacy in The Amazing Spider-Man and its sequel The Amazing Spider-Man 2. This version serves as Peter Parker's love interest, classmate, and character foil. Additionally, she works at Oscorp as an assistant to Dr. Curt Connors. After falling in love in the first film, the second film sees Parker and Stacy going through an on-and-off relationship before she is killed by the Green Goblin.
 In an interview with Screen Rant, Stone expressed interest in returning as a resurrected Stacy in a future The Amazing Spider-Man film, despite the character's death at the end of The Amazing Spider-Man 2. However, by July 2014, development on the follow-up films Sinister Six, The Amazing Spider-Man 3, and The Amazing Spider-Man 4 had stalled. The films would have seen Stone reprise her role, with the plot following Norman Osborn setting a resurrected amnesiac Stacy as Carnage against Parker, Harry, and the Sinister Six. By early 2015, a deal to reboot the series within the Marvel Cinematic Universe was reached, cancelling The Amazing Spider-Man franchise.
 In both films, Kari Coleman, Charlie DePew, Skyler Gisondo and Jacob Rodier portray members of the Stacy family: Helen Stacy (Gwen's mother) and Philip Stacy, Howard Stacy and Simon Stacy (Gwen's younger brothers) respectively.

Video games
 Gwen Stacy appears in The Amazing Spider-Man film tie-in game, voiced by Kari Wahlgren.
 Gwen Stacy appears as a playable character in Lego Marvel Super Heroes, voiced again by Kari Wahlgren.

Literature
 While she does not appear directly, Gwen Stacy's death plays an important role in the novel Revenge of the Sinister Six, by Adam-Troy Castro, the second part of his Sinister Six trilogy. Mysterio poses as Electro to take hostages on the same bridge where Stacy died and uses a holographic projection of her death to put Spider-Man at a psychological disadvantage. After Spider-Man drives Mysterio away, he takes a moment beside the hologram projector to mourn Stacy's death.
 Gwen Stacy is reinterpreted as "Paige Embry" in The Refrigerator Monologues. She is the unofficial leader of the Hell Hath Club, a group of women in the afterlife trying to cope with the brutal termination of their plot lines, and provides connecting narration for each of their stories.

Legacy
Due to the popularity of Spider-Gwen, in June 2015 Marvel published variant covers for 20 of their current series, which saw Gwen Stacy re-imagined as other Marvel characters, such as Doctor Strange, Groot and Wolverine. One of those variants, for "Deadpool's Secret Secret Wars #2", featured an amalgam of the design of Gwen Stacy and Wade Wilson dubbed "Gwenpool", which turned out to be especially popular with the fans. As the result, Marvel produced two stories featuring Gwenpool as a character, a backup story in the series "Howard the Duck", and a one-shot "Gwenpool Holiday Special #1", with Howard the Duck #1 establishing that her name is actually "Gwen Poole", not Gwen Stacy, or even an alternate version of either Gwen Stacy or Wade Wilson. Following the publication of the one-shot, an ongoing series titled The Unbelievable Gwenpool by the same creative team was announced, starting in April 2016.

See also
 The Night Gwen Stacy Died
 Spider-Man supporting characters
 Spider-Woman (Gwen Stacy)
 Sarah and Gabriel Stacy
 Dead No More: The Clone Conspiracy

References

External links
Gwen Stacy in Marvel Comics Database
The Unofficial Handbook of Marvel Comics Creators
Physics of Superheroes 1 - Death of Gwen Stacy
Spiderfan.org – Gwen Stacy

Characters created by Stan Lee
Characters created by Steve Ditko
Comics characters introduced in 1965
Female characters in film
Fictional characters from New York City
Fictional college students
Fictional high school students
Fictional models
Fictional Columbia University people
Marvel Comics film characters
Spider-Man characters
Teenage characters in film
Fictional murdered people
Marvel Comics female characters

sv:Spider-Man#Vänner